"Pour Some Sugar on Me" is a song by the English rock band Def Leppard from their 1987 album Hysteria. It reached number 2 on the US Billboard Hot 100 on 23 July 1988, behind "Hold On to the Nights" by Richard Marx. "Pour Some Sugar on Me" is considered the band's signature song, and was ranked #2 on VH1's "100 Greatest Songs of the 80s" in 2006.

Production
Near the end of recording the album Hysteria, during a production break, lead singer Joe Elliott was jamming with a riff he had come up with two weeks earlier on an acoustic guitar. Producer Mutt Lange, expressing great liking of it, suggested that it be developed into another song.

Although already behind schedule, Lange felt that the album was still missing a strong crossover hit and that this last song had the potential to be one.  Within two weeks the song was completed, smoothed out, and included as the 5th track on Hysteria.

Elliott claims the song was at least partially inspired by the Aerosmith and Run-DMC version of "Walk This Way", which made him realize the potential of the mixing of rap and rock.

The song's lyrics were written after Elliott and Lange went to opposite ends of the studio control room and delivered stream-of-consciousness words into a pair of dictaphones while the song's backing track played. They then swapped dictaphones and tried to determine what each other's words were. In the Hysteria episode of the Classic Albums documentary series, Elliott said he thought he heard the phrase "love is like a bomb" on Lange's tape "and that set the whole tone for the lyric."

Two intros were recorded for the song: the studio version has "Step inside, walk this way, you and me babe, hey hey!" and then cuts immediately to the guitar, while the single version has "love is like a bomb" and a slightly longer progression.

By the spring of 1988, Hysteria had sold 3 million copies, which was not enough to cover the album's $5 million production costs. Thus, the band edited footage from an upcoming concert film to make a new promo clip for "Pour Some Sugar on Me" and finally released it as the fourth single in North America.

Reception

The somewhat delayed success of "Pour Some Sugar on Me" (due to the new promo release) helped send Hysteria to number 1 on the Top Pop Albums chart (now the Billboard 200) a year after release, selling four million copies during the single's run. The song reached number 2 on the US Billboard Hot 100 (denied the top spot by "Hold On to the Nights" by Richard Marx), number 18 in the UK Singles Chart and number 26 on the ARIA charts (Australia).

MTV ranked "Pour Some Sugar on Me" number 1 in its "Top 300 Videos of All Time" countdown in May 1991. In 2006, VH1 ranked the song number 2 on its list of the "100 Greatest Songs of the '80s."

In 2012 due to royalty conflicts with their record company regarding profits from online sales, the band re-recorded the song, along with "Rock of Ages", under the title "Pour Some Sugar on Me 2012" and released both digitally in June 2012 (similarly, a re-recorded version of the single "Hysteria" entitled "Hysteria (2013 Re-Recorded Version)" was also released online the following year).

The song is a mainstays of classic rock and classic hits stations. In the 2010's, it was added to some adult contemporary stations despite never hitting that chart.

Music video
Two different music videos for the song were produced. The first version (directed by Russell Mulcahy) shows the band playing inside a derelict Irish stately home (Mount Merrion House at Stillorgan, Dublin) while it is being demolished by a wrecking ball and a burly, sledgehammer-wielding, female construction worker. Filmed before the song became a hit in the United States, a second video simply of the band playing the song live was released for American MTV. The American video (directed by Wayne Isham) was edited from the band's full-length 1989 video release, Live: In the Round, in Your Face, recorded at McNichols Sports Arena in Denver, CO, in February 1988. The music video for the song had an extended, distortion-laden intro in lieu of the album version's "Step inside, walk this way" intro. Most compilations use the extended music video-style intro.

Track listing 
7": Bludgeon Riffola / Mercury / 870 298-7 (USA)
 "Pour Some Sugar on Me"
 "Ring of Fire"

US Vinyl, 12"
 "Pour Some Sugar on Me" [Extended Version]
 "Pour Some Sugar on Me" [Album Version]
 "I Wanna Be Your Hero"

CD single: Bludgeon Riffola / Mercury / 8724872 (Germany)
 "Pour Some Sugar on Me" [Extended Version]
 "Release Me"
 "Rock of Ages" [Live Medley]

Personnel

Def Leppard
 Joe Elliott – lead vocals
 Phil Collen – lead guitars, backing vocals
 Steve Clark – rhythm and lead guitars 
 Vivian Campbell - rhythm guitar, backing vocals (2012 re-recording)
 Rick Savage – bass, backing vocals
 Rick Allen – drums

Charts

Weekly charts

Year-end charts

Certifications

See also
List of glam metal albums and songs

Notes

Notes

1987 singles
1987 songs
Def Leppard songs
Cashbox number-one singles
RPM Top Singles number-one singles
Song recordings produced by Robert John "Mutt" Lange
Songs written by Robert John "Mutt" Lange
Music videos directed by Russell Mulcahy
Music videos directed by Wayne Isham
Mercury Records singles
British pop rock songs
Songs involved in plagiarism controversies